The All Blacks is a name for the New Zealand national rugby union team.

All Blacks may also refer to:

New Zealand rugby 
All Blacks XV
Classic All Blacks
Junior All Blacks
Māori All Blacks
The Original All Blacks

Other contexts 
All Blacks F.C., a Ghanaian association football club
Burgess Hill Rugby Football Club, an English rugby club known as the "Sussex All Blacks"
Launceston Rugby Club, an English rugby club known as the "Cornish All Blacks"
Redfern All Blacks, an Australian rugby league club
San Francisco Seals (soccer), an American association football club previously known as the San Francisco All Blacks